The Bluefield Rams are the athletic teams that represent Bluefield University, located in Bluefield, Virginia, in intercollegiate sports as a member of the National Association of Intercollegiate Athletics (NAIA), primarily competing in the Appalachian Athletic Conference (AAC) for most of their sports since the 2014–15 academic year (which they were a member on a previous stint from 2001–02 to 2011–12); while its football team competes in the Mid-South Conference (MSC) since the 2014 fall season. They were also a member of the National Christian College Athletic Association (NCCAA), primarily competing as an independent in the Mid-East Region of the Division I level until after the 2019–20 school year to fully align with the NAIA. The Rams previously competed in the Mid-South as a full member from 2012–13 to 2013–14. Athletes make up about 60% of the student population at Bluefield. It serves as host for the NCAA Softball National Championship.

Varsity teams
Bluefield competes in 18 intercollegiate varsity sports: Men's sports include baseball, basketball, cross country, football, golf, soccer, tennis, track & field, volleyball and wrestling. Women's sports include basketball, cross country, soccer, softball, tennis, track & field and volleyball; and co-ed sports compete in cheerleading. Former sports included women's golf. The school has won national championships in men's soccer and baseball.

Achievements
In 2009, Bluefield won the NCCAA Baseball National Championship.

References

External links